Kareem Rahma is an Egyptian-American comedian, artist, and media entrepreneur. 

He is one of the founders of Nameless Network, a media company started by a group of former Vice employees. Rahma is a senior advisor to XTR, a community of documentary filmmakers. Previously, he worked at The New York Times, where his title was Growth Editor.

He has been nominated for three Webby awards including Best Individual Performance alongside Sam Morril and Trevor Noah, Best Longform Comedy, and Best Short Form Comedy alongside Trevor Noah and Ted Lasso.

Early life and education 
Rahma was born in Cairo and raised in Minnesota. He received his bachelor's degree in journalism from the University of Minnesota, Twin Cities, and attended the master of business communication program at the University of St. Thomas.

Entertainment and art works 
Rahma is known for his comic and creative works. He has served as producer and executive producer for several films, including "Miracle Fishing: Kidnapped Abroad," and "Ferguson Rises," both of which premiered at Tribeca Film Festival.

In 2020, he published a collection of poetry called "We Were Promised Flying Cars," a book of haiku about the future. The book, which has been described as dystopian, was promoted through a series of Cameo appearances by celebrities.

In 2020, he developed and produced "The Revolution Will be Televised," a video installation piece about police violence in the wake of George Floyd's murder. The video piece was projected onto the side of the Mill City Museum for several nights in June 2020.

Media career 
In 2021, Rahma and Andrew Kuo co-founded the podcast company SomeFriends, which is focused on elevating BIPOC stories and talent, with the mission of entertaining everybody. 

As Growth Editor at the New York Times, Rahma produced the outlet's first vertical video, a profile of Ryder Ripps that was available through Snapchat. After leaving the Times, Rahma (along with Alexandra Serio and Max Nelson) started a Kickstarter project called NYC.TV to bring public access TV online. This project brought short documentary films to The New York Times website in a project called Made With Kickstarter. The effort eventually led to the Nameless Network. Prior to working at the New York Times he was the Director of Marketing at VICE.

Rahma created "Museum of Pizza," a pop-up immersive art exhibition focused on pizza.

In 2010, he  launched SheWearsYourTee.com, a marketing effort wherein Tanaya Henry became a walking billboard.

References 

Living people
1986 births
American humorists
21st-century American comedians
American film producers
People from Minnesota